Brothers to the Rescue is a Miami-based activist nonprofit organization headed by José Basulto. Formed by Cuban exiles, the group is widely known for its opposition to the Cuban government and its former leader Fidel Castro. The group describes itself as a humanitarian organization aiming to assist and rescue raft refugees emigrating from Cuba and to "support the efforts of the Cuban people to free themselves from dictatorship through the use of active non-violence". Brothers to the Rescue, Inc., was founded in May 1991 "after several pilots were touched by the death of" fifteen-year-old Gregorio Perez Ricardo, who "fleeing Castro's Cuba on a raft, perished of severe dehydration in the hands of U.S. Coast Guard officers who were attempting to save his life."

The Cuban government accuses them of involvement in terrorist acts, and infiltrated the group (see  
Juan Pablo Roque and the Wasp Network).

In 1996, two Brothers to the Rescue planes were shot down by the Cuban Air Force in international airspace. The incident was condemned internationally, including by the UN Security Council while the Cuban government defended the decision claiming the planes were there to destabilize the Cuban government. The Castro-approved mission against Brothers to the Rescue was codenamed "Operation Scorpion."

History

Humanitarian missions

In its early years, the group actively rescued rafters from Cuba and claims to have saved thousands of Cubans who were emigrating from the country. Eventually, the group's focus shifted after changes in US immigration policy meant that rafters would be sent back to Cuba.

The group's founder has stated that after August 1995, it stopped seeing rafters in the water. Heavily dependent on funding for rafting activities, the group's funding rapidly dropped to $320,455 in 1995, down from $1.5 million the year before. As a result, the group focused more on civil disobedience against the Cuban government. At least once, the group's founder dropped leaflets on Cuba.

Roque and Wasp Network

One of the group's pilots, Cuban Juan Pablo Roque, a former major in the Cuban air force, unexpectedly left on February 23, 1996, the day before the two planes were shot down, and turned up in Havana, where he condemned the group. Roque had left Cuba four years earlier and was recruited by the Brothers shortly afterward, flying several missions.

Despite being dismissed as a Cuban agent by US officials, Roque denied working for the Cuban government and claimed to have returned home after being disillusioned with the Brothers. He claimed that they had plans to carry out attacks on military bases in Cuba and to disrupt its defense communications.

Roque appeared on Cuban television on February 26, 1996, where he denounced the Brothers as an illegal and anti-Cuban organization the fundamental purpose of which is to provoke incidents that aggravated relations between Cuba and United States. In an interview with the International Civil Aviation Organization (ICAO), he stated that the group had planned to introduce anti-personnel weapons into Cuba and blow up high tension pylons to interrupt the energy supply.

While in Miami, Roque had contacts with and was paid by the FBI. His claims brought questions about the role of agencies such as the FBI and CIA in the activities of the exile community. However, White House spokesperson David Johnson said that "there does not exist, nor has there existed, any tie between the North American intelligence services and Hermanos al Rescate", adding that the organization is "not a front" for those services, nor is it financed by them. José Basulto agrees with US officials that Roque was a Cuban spy who, along with the Wasp Network, infiltrated the Brothers.

Rene Gonzalez, another Wasp Network spy, also infiltrated Brothers to the Rescue and regularly sabotaged aircraft and reported on its activities until his subsequent arrest.

1996 shootdown incident

On February 24, 1996, two of the Brothers to the Rescue Cessna Skymasters involved in releasing leaflets to fall on Cuba were shot down by a Cuban Air Force MiG-29UB. The four people in the aircraft were killed: Carlos Costa, Armando Alejandre, Jr., Mario de la Peña, and Pablo Morales.

Promoted to lieutenant colonel after the shootdown, Roque has lived in a government-provided Havana home with security since the incident. In an interview with The Miami Herald in 2012, he expressed remorse for the shootdown. "If I could travel in a time machine", he said, "I'd get those boys off the planes that were shot down." In 1999, he was indicted on federal charges of defrauding the FBI and failing to register as a foreign agent. However, Cuba has refused to extradite him. To this day, the Cuban exile community in South Florida considers Roque a traitor.

See also

Cuba-United States relations

Notes

External links
Brothers to the Rescue Official Website
Rosa M. Abella Collection, 1996-1997, an archival collection that contains clippings, other archival materials, and a bibliography, co-authored by Rosa M. Abella and Dolores Rovirosa, of sources that discuss the 1996 shootdown. 
Inter-American Commission on Human Rights report on killings of Armando Alejandre Jr. (45 years old), Carlos Alberto Costa (29), Mario Manuel de la Peña (24), Pablo Morales (29)
Shoot Down, a 2006 film about the shootdown, co-produced by the niece of one of the four victims.
KTOK Radio Interview on the Cuban Five and the shootdown of Brothers to the Rescue—aired on February 9 and 10, 2009, conducted by Radio Host, Reid Mullins.
BETRAYAL: Clinton, Castro & the Cuban Five, a 2009 book that brings together 13 years of intensive research into the events of the shootdown, co-authored by Matt Lawrence and Thomas Van Hare.
 Carl Nagin, The New Yorker, January 26, 1998, Annals of Diplomacy - Backfire
 Seagull One: The Amazing True Story of Brothers to the Rescue. Prellezo, Lily, and Basulto, Jose.  University Press of Florida (September 26, 2010)

Cuba–United States relations
Organizations based in Florida
Opposition to Fidel Castro
Nonviolence organizations based in the United States
Organizations based in Miami
Organizations established in 1991
Cuban-American culture in Florida
1991 establishments in Florida